George Thomas Nugent (born 4 December 2001) is an English professional footballer who plays as a winger for Prescot Cables on loan from Witton Albion. He previously played for Tranmere Rovers.

Club career

Tranmere Rovers
Nugent progressed through the youth structure at Tranmere Rovers  and made his first team debut for in a 2-1 defeat to Leicester City F.C. Under-21's in the 2019–20 EFL Trophy, and signed his first professional contract in July 2020. He was released by the club at the end of the season.

Witton Albion
After his release he joined Witton Albion in July 2021.

Loan to Prescot Cables
In November he joined Prescot Cables on loan.

Personal life
Nugent's brother, Ollie, is also a footballer, and represented Great Britain at the 2016 Summer Paralympics.

Career statistics

References

Living people
2001 births
English footballers
Association football forwards
Tranmere Rovers F.C. players
Prescot Cables F.C. players
Witton Albion F.C. players
Sportspeople from Birkenhead